The 2007 Red Deer municipal election was held Monday, October 15, 2007. Since 1968, provincial legislation has required every municipality to hold triennial elections. The citizens of Red Deer, Alberta, elected one mayor, eight councillors (all at large) to the Red Deer City Council, the seven Red Deer School District No. 104 trustees (at large), and five of the Red Deer Catholic Regional Division No. 39's seven trustees (as Ward Red Deer). Of the 61,445 eligible voters, only 13,282 turned in a ballot, a voter turnout of 21.6%, and an average of 6.3 aldermen per ballot.

Results
Bold indicates elected, and incumbents are italicized.

Mayor

Councillors

Public School Trustees

Separate School Trustees

References

Red Deer
2007